Soma Singh (born 26 July 1965) is a British former international field hockey player, who captained his country and played 189 times for England and GB, represented Great Britain at the 1996 Summer Olympics in Atlanta.

Coaching 

Soma Singh is currently the Director of Hockey at Lord Wandsworth College and head coach at Alton Hockey Club and Old Georgians Hockey Club.

In June 2012 Soma Singh was awarded England Hockey's Club Coach of the Season after leading Richmond men's 1st XI into the Men's England Hockey League Conference East, the team's third consecutive promotion.

References

External links
 

1965 births
Living people
British male field hockey players
Olympic field hockey players of Great Britain
Field hockey players at the 1996 Summer Olympics
Hampstead & Westminster Hockey Club players
Southgate Hockey Club players
1990 Men's Hockey World Cup players